Stephen Sung Lin Yung (born 7 May 1965 in Tianjin) is a retired Chinese football player who represented the Hong Kong football team. Starting his career in China he played for the Chinese U-20 and the Chinese Olympic team before he established himself with Chinese top tier side Tianjin where he played as a forward. Moving away from China he joined Hong Kong football team South China and became their utility player playing anywhere on the field, though he spent most of time as a defensive midfielder where he had a successful time with them winning several cups and the 1996–97 Hong Kong First Division League title with them. He would then become a Hong Kong permanent resident before he played for the Hong Kong national team and played a major role in Hong Kong's World Cup Qualifiers in 1997. By 1998, he moved to other Hong Kong football teams Sing Tao and then Instant-Dict before he retired.

Honours
South China AA
Hong Kong First Division League: 1996–97
Hong Kong Senior Shield: 1995–96, 1996–97
Hong Kong Viceroy Cup: 1993–94, 1997–98
Hong Kong FA Cup: 1995–96

References

External links

Profile (Chinese)

1965 births
Living people
Chinese footballers
Footballers from Tianjin
China international footballers
Hong Kong international footballers
Hong Kong First Division League players
Tianjin Jinmen Tiger F.C. players
South China AA players
Association football utility players
Footballers at the 1998 Asian Games
Asian Games competitors for Hong Kong